Time portals are doorways in time, employed in various fiction genres, especially science fiction and fantasy, to transport characters to the past or future.

They differ from time machines in being a permanent or semi-permanent fixture linking specific points in time, and thus are an especially useful plot device when the plot involves characters moving many times back and forth.

Appearance
Time portals can be represented as vortices of energy, which allow matter to travel from one point in time to another by passing through the portal, or may appear as an ordinary doorway.

In popular culture

Film
In most films, time portals are used to take a group of people or a single person back in time. The most popular of all time travels would be traveling back to the time of the dinosaurs. In some films time portals can also be set as a hazard, for example, they can begin to go haywire which makes them accidentally transport something or someone from a different time to the present; again the most popular is a dinosaur being accidentally brought into the present world.

Television
The 1966-67 TV series The Time Tunnel.

In the 1967 Star Trek episode "The City on the Edge of Forever", a temporarily deranged Dr. Leonard McCoy runs into a time portal, an ancient sentient stone-like ring which calls itself the Guardian of Forever, and is transported back to 1930s Depression-era Earth and history is changed as shown when the Enterprise disappears from orbit. Captain James T. Kirk and Spock follow through the time portal to set things right.

In the 1969 Star Trek episode "All Our Yesterdays", Captain James T. Kirk accidentally passes through a time portal. Spock and Leonard McCoy try to recover Kirk. All three are transported into the past of the planet Sarpeidon

In the TV series Mirror, Mirror and its sequel Mirror, Mirror II, the story revolves around an old mirror. At the beginning of the story it is discovered that the mirror can be used to travel back into the past, 1919 and 1867 respectively.

In the documentary Prehistoric Park in which Nigel Marven activates a time portal to travel to different geologic time periods to rescue rare prehistoric species.

In the BBC television series; Goodnight Sweetheart, the main character; Gary Sparrow uses a time-portal to go back in time from the 1990s to World War II era Britain.

In The Girl from Tomorrow Part II: Tomorrow's End, a time portal called The Time Gate is used by a terrorist from the year 2500 to take water from 1990 to his own time.

The science fiction TV series Torchwood centres most on the effects of a rift in both time and space, through which humans, aliens and devices emerge.

In the science fiction TV series Primeval, a group of scientists investigate time anomalies, through which creatures travel.

11.22.63 features a school teacher being sent by a terminally-ill friend to go back to the 1960s (via a time portal in a diner closet) to prevent the assassination of John F. Kennedy, adapted from the novel by Stephen King.

Computer games
Time portals are a common element in computer games, most notably the TimeSplitters series, which involves characters utilizing time portals to move through time and is intrinsic to the plotlines in the second and third installments of the series, where a character called Sergeant Cortez moves through time to complete his objective by using these portals.

Time portals are also the original mode of time travel in the SNES game Chrono Trigger. There are quite a few of them found throughout the game and seem to be activated by the use of a "key" made by Lucca. The original portal found in the game actually occurs due to an accident that takes place at the beginning of the game involving Marle's pendant and a teleporting experiment.

Most time portals are generated via a handheld item such as a watch, or a glove. However, some time portals are such things as mirrors, or other items such as a key in the Harry Potter series.  Literal portals, which are not items that you would use on a day-to-day basis, are also common.

"Time rips" and time travel in general are the central theme and plot engine in Space Quest IV: Roger Wilco and the Time Rippers as the titular character, Roger Wilco, is sent into the future by means of a time rip in order to save his home planet, which had already experienced a series of crises in the future time period to which he is initially sent. Throughout the game, Roger Wilco travels through different time periods in the future to complete various goals by using time-traveling vehicles called "time pods."

In the Final Fantasy XI expansion Wings of the Goddess, grotesque statues called Cavernous Maws serve as time portals to the age of the Crystal War.

Time travel devices